Dasada (stylized in all-caps) is a Japanese television series starring members of the idol group Hinatazaka46. The show aired on Nippon TV at 1:00 AM to 1:30 AM on Thursdays, and was available on Hulu Japan after it finished airing. The opening and closing themes are both included on Hinatazaka46's single, "Sonna Koto Nai yo". The series is the second television drama series starring Hinatazaka46, after Re:Mind.

Plot 
High school student Yuria Sada finds out that her parents are at risk of losing their dressmaking shop to debt collectors unless they can repay their 10 million yen debt within six months. Teaming up with fellow classmate and aspiring fashion designer Saori Shinohara, Yuria launches a clothing brand named "Dasada" to repay the debt.

Cast 
All active members of Hinatazaka46 make an appearance in the series (Yūka Kageyama and Hiyori Hamagishi were on hiatus during production and did not appear). Major roles include:

 Nao Kosaka as : An airheaded second-year student who thinks she looks very cute. Her family owns the Sada Dressmaking Shop.
 Miho Watanabe as : A second-year student in the same class as Yuria. She becomes the designer of Dasada's clothes.
 Kyōko Saitō as : A third-year student and the volleyball club president.
 Shiho Katō as : A third-year student who also works as a model under the stage name Serenadé, which makes her popular among her peers.
 Mirei Sasaki as : A second-year student in the same class as Yuria. Her sister Tororo, played by Mao Iguchi, is a gravure idol.
 Kumi Sasaki as : A second-year student and Yuria's childhood friend.
 Suzuka Tomita as : A second-year student and Yuria's childhood friend.
 Members of the idol group Factory
 Mei Higashimura as 
 Konoka Matsuda as 
 Hina Kawata as 
Former AKB48 member Yūka Tano also appears as a volleyball club member.

Production and release 
The fashion brand Dasada was launched in real life and modeled by Hinatazaka46 members at the 30th Tokyo Girls Collection fashion show, held on 29 February 2020 at the Yoyogi National Gymnasium. Due to the COVID-19 pandemic, the fashion show was held via livestreaming only.

A re-run of the series with audio commentary by the cast, titled , was aired from July 2 to September 10.

Notes

References

External links 
  at Nippon TV 
  

Hinatazaka46
2020 Japanese television series debuts
Nippon TV dramas